Anna Bligh was sworn in as Premier of Queensland on 13 September 2007 with her first ministry, replacing Peter Beattie, who had retired from politics, and his ministry. She subsequently won the 2009 state election with a reduced majority against the newly merged Liberal National Party of Queensland. Shortly thereafter, on 26 March 2009, Bligh reshuffled the ministry. She conducted a second reshuffle on 21 February 2011. Following her party's loss at the 2012 state election, she soon resigned as Premier to make way for the Newman Ministry.

Initial ministry
The first Bligh ministry was sworn in on 13 September 2007.

Changes
 On 25 April 2008, Bligh reassigned two parliamentary secretaries. Ronan Lee moved from assisting the Minister for Main Roads and Local Government to working for the Attorney-General, Minister for Justice and Minister assisting the Premier in Western Queensland. Specifically, he was to assist on the Fair Trade portfolio, dealing with payday loans and the like. Phil Reeves, the Parliamentary Secretary to the Premier, took on the additional responsibility of Parliamentary Secretary for Veterans.
 Ronan Lee defected to the Greens on 5 October 2008; Annastacia Palaszczuk was appointed to his former post of Parliamentary Secretary for Main Roads and Local Government on 9 October 2008.

March 2009 reshuffle
On 26 March 2009, following the 2009 election, Bligh's reshuffled ministry was sworn in.

February 2011 reshuffle
Bligh again reshuffled the ministry on 21 February 2011.

Changes
 On 22 June 2011, Kate Jones resigned to concentrate on her re-election contest in Ashgrove, fighting against Liberal National Party Leader Campbell Newman. Vicky Darling took over the Environment part of her portfolio and was in turn replaced as a Deputy Government Whip by Grace Grace. The Natural Resources portion of the brief was given to Rachel Nolan, making her Minister for Finance, Natural Resources and The Arts.
 Paul Lucas resigned as Deputy Premier (retaining his other portfolios), having announced the previous day he would stand down from politics at the next election. Andrew Fraser replaced him.

References

Queensland ministries
Australian Labor Party ministries in Queensland